The 2020 AFF Championship Final was the final of the 2020 AFF Championship. It was played between Indonesia and Thailand in two legs, both played at the National Stadium, Kallang, Singapore. The first leg was held on 29 December 2021 and the second leg took place on 1 January 2022. Thailand won a record-extending sixth title 6–2 on aggregate. This was the highest-scoring AFF Championship final, which also produced a larger margin of victory than any finals before.

Thailand won the first leg 4–0, the biggest defeat for either side in this fixture since their meeting at the 1985 Southeast Asian Games, when Thailand as the host country won 7–0 against Indonesia. With a four-goal margin of defeat, this was also the biggest defeat in an AFF Championship final, in any legged tie. The previous joint-biggest defeats were by a three-goal margin (4–1 in the 2000 single leg final and 3–0 in the first leg of the 2010 final), both of which coincidentally featured Indonesia as the losing side. In the second leg, Indonesia stroke first but conceded two in three minutes before equalising with just minutes to go as they avoided to become the first team to lose both legs of the final since themselves to Singapore in 2004.

Background 
The 2020 AFF Championship (officially known as the 2020 AFF Suzuki Cup for sponsorship reasons) was the 13th edition of the AFF Championship, the 13th edition of the football championship of nations affiliated to the ASEAN Football Federation (AFF), and the seventh as the AFF Suzuki Cup. The tournament was due to be held at the said year but was postponed due to the COVID-19 pandemic which started in early 2020.

This was the sixth AFF Championship final for Indonesia, having qualified and lost the 2000, 2002, 2004, 2010, and 2016 finals.

This was the ninth AFF Championship final for Thailand, having won the 1996, 2000, 2002, 2014, and 2016 finals, and lost in 2007, 2008, and 2012.

Both were teams with the most appearances in the AFF Championship finals; Thailand was leading the all-time championship table with five titles to their name. At the other hand, Indonesia had lost all five of their previous finals, two more than the second-worst, Thailand. They had met three times in the AFF Championship final, with Thailand winning in 2000, 2002, and 2016. In all competitions, Thailand won 38 meetings between the sides, Indonesia won 20, and 23 matches ended in draws – including those ended with penalties – prior to the final. Prior to the 2001 Southeast Asian Games, which saw age-group teams playing in place of senior teams ever since, both countries met in every edition of the games between 1977 and 1997. Among 12 matches, two were in the gold medal matches of 1991 and 1997, in which one side defeated the other on penalties.

Both countries played the final without their national flags due to non-compliance with conditions set by the World Anti-Doping Agency (WADA).

Route to the final 

Note: In all results below, the score of the finalist is given first (H: home; A: away). Home and away are administrative only, since all matches were played in Singapore.

Matches

First leg

Second leg

Notes

References

External links 
 AFF Suzuki Cup 2020 – Official website

Final
AFF Championship Finals
Indonesia national football team matches
Thailand national football team matches
AFF Championship Final
AFF Championship Final
2021 in Indonesian football
2021 in Thai football
2022 in Indonesian football
2022 in Thai football